Saint Petersburg Philharmonia, officially the Saint Petersburg Academic Philharmonia Named After D. D. Shostakovich, is a music society located in Saint Petersburg, Russia, and is the name of the building where it is housed.  Also there is another one building of Saint Petersburg Philharmonic Society: Malii Zal (Small Hall). The location of the Small Hall is in the city centre. The society now hosts two symphony orchestras: Saint Petersburg Philharmonic Orchestra and  Saint Petersburg Academic Symphony Orchestra.

History
 St. Petersburg Philharmonia was established in 1802.
 The building currently housing the Philharmonia was completed 1839.  Architect: P. Jacot; and Facade design: C. Rossi.

Location
St. Petersburg Philharmonia is housed in a large building complex.

Bolshoi Zal
The Bolshoi Zal (meaning the Grand Hall) has a capacity of 1500 seats.  It is one of the best known music halls in Russia. F.Liszt, H.Berlioz, R.Wagner, A.Dvořák, J.Sibelius, C.-A.Debussy, R.Strauss, S.Rachmaninoff, S.Prokofiev, D.Shostakovich, A.Scriabin, G.Mahler, A.Rubinstein, K.Schumann, P.Viardo, P.Sarasate, 
A.Schoenberg, I.Stravinsky, B.Bartok, P.Hindemith and others renowned musicians of the XIX-ХХ 
centuries performed here, and many works of such exponents of Russian classical tradition as 
A.Borodin, M.Mussorgsky, P.Tchaikovsky, N.Rimsky-Korsakov, A.Glazunov were premiered here. The hall's acoustics are excellent, but judged by some not to be the best in town.

Anecdotes
It is a well established custom in Bolshoi Zal and elsewhere in Saint Petersburg for a symphony orchestra to play  "The Hymn to the Great City", composed by Reinhold Glière, praising the heroic defence in the Siege of Leningrad, as the last piece of encore music.

Gallery

See also
 Mariinsky Theatre

References

External links
 Official Site
 Theaters and Concert Halls in Saint Petersburg, Russia

Culture in Saint Petersburg
Concert halls in Russia
Cultural infrastructure completed in 1839
1802 establishments in the Russian Empire
Cultural heritage monuments of federal significance in Saint Petersburg